Talmon is an Israeli settlement in the West Bank. Located in the West Binyamin at an elevation of nearly 600 metres and 18 km east of Modiin, it is organised as a community settlement and falls under the jurisdiction of Mateh Binyamin Regional Council.

The international community considers Israeli settlements in the West Bank illegal under international law, but the Israeli government disputes this.

History
Israel confiscated  land  from several Palestinian villages in order to construct Talmon, including:

taking land  from private Palestinians citizens of Al-Janiya, 
land confiscated from the town of Al-Ittihad, 
in addition to  289 dunams confiscated from Al-Zaitounah.

Talmon was founded in 1989, with the name taken from the family name of the family of gatekeepers of the Temple in Jerusalem who returned to rebuild Jerusalem during the time of Nehemiah.

The settlement of Neria was originally built on land designated for Talmon, but it is now independent.

Notable residents
Gilad Sha'er, 16-year-old killed in the 2014 kidnapping and murder of Israeli teenagers

References

Religious Israeli settlements
Populated places established in 1989
Mateh Binyamin Regional Council
1989 establishments in the Israeli Civil Administration area
Community settlements
Israeli settlements in the West Bank